Jacques Timmermans (13 October 1945 – 16 December 2021) was a Belgian politician.

He was a member of the Socialist Party and served in the Parliamentary Assembly of the Council of Europe, the Flemish Council, the Senate, and the Chamber of Representatives. Timmermans died on 16 December 2021, at the age of 76.

Awards
 Officer of the Order of Leopold (2003)

References

1945 births
2021 deaths
Belgian politicians
Socialistische Partij Anders politicians
Members of the Senate (Belgium)
Members of the Chamber of Representatives (Belgium)
Members of the Flemish Parliament
Members of the Parliamentary Assembly of the Council of Europe
People from Ninove
Order of Leopold (Belgium)